Alexander Levy (1909–1997), later known as William Alexander Levy, was an American architect who worked principally in Southern California.

Early in his career, he was influenced by the work of Frank Lloyd Wright and Le Corbusier. At New York University's new School of Architecture, he studied under Raymond Bossange and Ely Jacques Kahn.  One of his art and clay modeling instructors was sculptor Concetta Scaravaglione.

Also at NYU, he had as an instructor of English famed writer Thomas Wolfe, whose The Party at Jack's (UNC-Chapel Hill, 1995, pp. 41–42) shows remarkable writing on architecture, perhaps related to his strong association with the school and its students, whom he considered among his best.

In 1933 or 1934, he worked briefly for skyscraper designer Raymond Hood, who also had been an occasional lecturer at NYU.  Renovation of dilapidated structures at Fort Schuyler in the Bronx was Alexander's first commission, one funded by the U.S. government.  Other chiefly private client commissions followed.  These included interiors for designer Christian Dior, novelist/ travel writer Conrad Bercovicci, and biographer Marcia Davenport.

Alexander is best known for the design and building of Hangover House in Laguna Beach, California, commissioned by travel writer Richard Halliburton in 1937. The house had three bedrooms, one for Halliburton, one for Alexander, and one for Paul Mooney, Halliburton's companion and writing assistant, who collaborated with Halliburton on his later writing projects and who managed construction of the house.  In 1937, writer Ayn Rand, then unknown, visited Hangover House and Alexander provided her with quotes for her forthcoming novel The Fountainhead (1943).  According to Alexander, Rand's descriptions of the Heller House are thinly disguised references to the house.

Later, Alexander assisted composer Arnold Schoenberg in the redesign of his studio in Brentwood, and also designed a house in Encino for scriptwriter David Greggory. The house in the Hollywood Hills he built for himself he called the House in Space, distinct as an early example in the region of cantilever construction. Alexander also designed wooden furniture and bowls.

Alexander continued to practice architecture and interior design and by 1950 had moved permanently to West Hollywood.

He considered the Hotel Rancho de la Palmilla in Las Cruces (near La Paz, Baja California, today Baja California Sur), which he designed and built in the 1950s for the son of former Mexican President Abelardo L. Rodríguez, his best work.

In 1952, Alexander opened The Mart, one of the first art and antique boutiques in Los Angeles, on Santa Monica Boulevard, operating it until 1977. During this period, he occasionally had bit parts in feature films, notably The Shootist, starring John Wayne, and The McMasters, starring Brock Peters, his sometime business partner at The Mart.  A developer of the Hollywood Hills and a philanthropist, Alexander became a patron of the arts and a world traveler.

Alexander's papers are kept at the Architecture and Design Collection, at the Art, Design & Architecture Museum, at the University of California, Santa Barbara.

Buildings and Projects
1938: Richard Halliburton House, Laguna Beach, California
1939: Arnold Schoenberg music studio remodel, Brentwood, California
1948: David Greggory house, Encino, California
1953: "House in Space," Los Angeles, California
1955-58: Hotel Las Cruces Palmilla, San José del Cabo, Mexico
1956: Abelardo "Rod" Rodriguez II house, San José del Cabo, Mexico
1957: Robert Fisher house, San Jose del Cabo, Mexico
1970: Village Plan for Todos Santos, Mexico

References

Additional Sources
1951 Photo of William Alexander by Edmund Teske, Los Angeles County Museum of Art
Max, Gerry. Horizon Chasers--The Lives and Adventures of Richard Halliburton and Paul Mooney. (McFarland, 2007).
Max, Gerry.  Many Mansions.  Unpublished monograph on the life and achievement of William Alexander (née Levy), Aldo Magi Collection in Thomas Wolfe Papers at the University of North Carolina, Chapel Hill, c1997
Max, Gerry, "Student Themes: William Alexander Remembers Thomas Wolfe," The Thomas Wolfe Review, 2012, Volume 36, Nos. 1 & 2, pp. 135–143.

1909 births
1997 deaths
Modernist architecture in California
American interior designers
20th-century American architects
People from Brooklyn